Mitrovtsi is a village in northwestern Bulgaria, part of Chiprovtsi Municipality, Montana Province.

It is positioned beside the main road Sofia – Belogradchik – Vidin, between the villages of Beli Mel and Gorna Luka.

Administration:
Country: Bulgaria   
Region: Montana   
County: Chiprovtsi   
Mayor: Zahari Zamfirov

Geography
The village of Mitrovtsi is surrounded mainly with areas which are included in the “NATURA 2000” ecological network, consisting of relatively low mountains – below 1000 m high. Broadleaved woods cover the slopes of those mountains (oak, beech, hornbeam), with broad valleys in between them. The trees are covered with moss, many kinds of mushrooms can be found as well. Pinks, Orchids, Daisies, Peter's Crosses and many other interesting plants grow here, some of them – endemits. The fauna is represented by Deer Stag, Rhino Beetle, other stag-beetles and rare insects. Many other amphibians, reptilians and rodents can be met as well. Game consists of wild boars, roes, foxes, rabbits and wolves are a trouble for the local farmers during some of the colder winters.

History
In the North-Western end of the village, right beside the “Krachtina” gulch, the “Gradishte” hill stands tall, where an ancient Roman military camp has been established. No archeological research has been conducted on it.

The village becomes known from Turkish documents (it is mentioned for the first time in 1666 in the Rusi Staikov inventory – “National Library “Vasil Kolarov”. Notes for 1959”. T. 1 (7), Sofia, 1961, p. 324, Bervkovitsa's Cadi) and notes belonging to European travelers like Mitrovuts and Mitrovitsa. After the liberation from Ottoman slavery it receives an administrative name - “Mitrovtsi”. 13 houses who are eligible for taxation by the Ottoman Empire are present in the 1666 registry books. 113 house and 679 population were registered in 1881, all Slavic.

The oldest hamlet in the village is called Kotromantsi (or Gmitrentsi). Those are probably the earliest settlers. Mitrovtsi is the first village after the Myzian and transit dialects which is present between Mitrovitsa and the neighboring Beli Mel. Benio Tzonev was the first one to notice this. The Ascension of Christ Church was built in 1871 replacing an older one. In the past the art specialist Asen Vasiliev saw 23 icons in this church, which was moved from the older temple, one of those icons dated in year 1843. The church was built by crafters from Slavinie, in Pirot region. An extremely valuable, interwoven with gold pall was preserved in the church. Today the pall is located in the Chiprovtsi museum. Some of the old icons were stolen or destroyed. Old frescos can be seen in the church as well.

During the communism in Bulgaria the church was turned into a cattle-shed and was repaired and renovated in 1995 – an initiative of Major Engineer Ognian Tasov (ret.), a grandson of Zahari Stefanov who was sentenced by the People's Court, and was sanctified by his Right Reverend the Vidin Bishop Dometian. Today the church needs a new belfry.

The village participates actively in the fight for liberation against the Turks. In the middle of the 19th century (probably – in Vidin revolt) a band of freedom fighters was organized, led by the village's “capetain”  - the great grandfather of the famous Bulgarian chemist – professor Ivan Mladenov. Some of the villagers in the band died. The village is also an old center of Tannery craft, which was the family business of many citizens of Mitrovitsa. In 18th century leather crafted in Mitrovitsa has received Deeds on an exhibit held in Viena. The ethnographer Dimitar Marinov who visited the village in the end of the 19th century noted that machines were invented by the locals to process the animal hides into fine leather. Raw hides from the Mitrovitsa area used to be bought in bulk by different regions in Bulgaria.

After a long and difficult leather processing much of the production was exported in European countries with trains or steam boats along Denube river, through Oriahovo and Lom ports. During the first half of 20th century almost all the men in the village were abroad to work – South America or USA. There are documents describing workers returning from abroad to participate in the wars. Some of the citizens of Mitrovtsi have not return to Bulgaria but they earned good positions abroad. These circumstances contribute to the citizens of Mitrovtsi being one of the richest people in the region until the coming of communism. After 1944 many of the villagers emigrate in Western Europe and USA – in the cities of Denver, Detroit, Chicago, etc. In present days there are two companies in Mitrovtsi that provide work for three villages in the area: “Arsov-90” LTD – a carpentry company and “Integra” LTD – a furniture production plant.

Customs
Saint John's Day is celebrated each year in the village of Mitrovtsi on January 20 (old) or – the closest Saturday to January 20. On these day all the people who carry the name Ivan (John) go out in front of their houses and treat everyone. Village's annual fair is celebrated on Ascension of Christ Day, on the last Sunday of May. Moreover, Trifon Zarezan is celebrated in the village, as it is in the rest of the country, although the holiday was not typical and was introduced after the World War One. All the people and their guests gather and go to the vineyards. Each family has a vineyard and this is a tradition. Fires are lit and then the real celebration commences.

There is music and festivities all day long. The most important event is the “yellow vest” – it is given to the most drunkest person at the vineyards. A “King of the Vineyards” is also nominated – the person who has made the best wine. People from Mitrovitsi are famous with their sense of humor. Saint Ilia is a famous holiday as well. On this day everyone used to gather in Dren area where they were eating “prayer” – a soup from a sacrificed animal – a black ram. Now the place is destroyed by treasure-hunters. The ruins of “Mislovitsa” monastery are located close by. It is not researched and is only mentioned in “Spiritual Culture” (1973, number 2), but several years ago a group of archeologists has spoken with the locals and categorize the monastery as catholic.

Notable people
Marusya Ivanova Lyubcheva (born 1949), Bulgarian politician

Others
Illegal logging and the high-mobile logging trucks are the only enemies of the beautiful nature in the area. With a relatively good for a Bulgarian village infrastructure, Mitrovitsa is an excellent recreational place and a way to reach out a life of harmony from the past century.

Villages in Montana Province
Chiprovtsi Municipality